James Edgerton may refer to:

 James A. Edgerton (1869–?), American poet, philosopher and political activist
 James Clark Edgerton (1896–1973), U.S. Army aviator